Munsee-Delaware Nation (Munsee: Nalahii Lunaapewaak, meaning: Lenapes from the Upstream, in contrast with The Lenape at Moraviantown, referred to as "Downstrean Lenapes")  is a Lenape First Nations band government located  west of St. Thomas, in southwest Ontario, Canada. Known previously as the Munsee of the Thames, their land base is the  Munsee-Delaware Nation 1 reserve, with the unincorporated community of Muncey (west from the Oneida Nation of the Thames) as their main community. The reserve is splintered into several non-contiguous areas, made up of individual lots within the Chippewas of the Thames reserve. As of January 2014, their registered population was 612 people, though only 148 lived on their own reserve.

History
Members of the Munsee branch of the Lenape (Delaware) nation arrived in the area in the eighteenth century. The Lieutenant-Governor, John Graves Simcoe, encouraged the Munsee to settle there although Chippewa were already established there. In 1819 the Chippewa of the Thames reserve was established, and in 1840 the Munsee and the Chippewa finally reached an agreement to share the land. In 1967 the Munsee portion became part of the current reserve, which was established by Order in Council.

Demographics
The Munsee-Delaware First Nation had a registered population of 524 in April 2004, of whom 163 lived on the reserve. By January 2011, the nation had a total registered population of 555, of whom 145 lived on the reserve.

Governance
Munsee-Delaware Nation's Chief and Council are elected officials who serve a two (2) year term of office. Elections are governed by their own Band Custom Election Code. Chief and Council are directly accountable to the band membership for the success of the Nation and the conduct of its affairs and for carrying out the community's mission and vision.

The history of Munsee-Delaware Nation elected Chief and Council are:

2014 / 2016 Term - Chief Roger Thomas, Head Councillor Aaron Dolson Jr., Councillor Ryan Peters, Councillor Rose Snake, Councillor Candy Thomas
2012 / 2014 Term - Chief Patrick Waddilove, Head Councillor Rose Snake, Councillor Frank Cooper, Councillor Dean Snake, Councillor Leander Snake
Bi-election August 3, 2013 - Chief Roger Thomas
2010 / 2012 Term - Chief Patrick Waddilove, Head Councillor Rose Snake, Councillor -

Services
 Administration
 Community Centre (which provides ready access to health care and police services)
 Child Care Centre
 Ontario Works

See also
Moraviantown
Christian Munsee
Delaware People
Delaware languages
Munsee language

References

External links
Munsee-Delaware Nation Website
AANDC profile
 Southern First Nations Secretariat: Munsee-Delaware First Nation
 Munsee-Delaware Nation 1 at Aboriginal Canada Portal
 Munsee-Delaware First Nation at Chiefs of Ontario (number 76)

Lenape reserves in Ontario
Communities in Middlesex County, Ontario